King Uncle is a 1993 Indian Hindi-language action comedy film directed by Rakesh Roshan. The film stars Jackie Shroff and Anu Aggarwal. Shah Rukh Khan, Nagma, Paresh Rawal, Sushmita Mukherjee, Pooja Ruparel, Deven Verma appear in supporting roles. The film was inspired from the 1982 English film Annie that starred Aileen Quinn and Albert Finney, which in turn is based upon the 1924 comic strip Little Orphan Annie by Harold Gray. The film was box office success and has since gained cult status, being well received by families and children. Both Shroff and Ruparel's performances received critical acclaim.

Synopsis
Ashok Bansal (Jackie Shroff) is an extremely wealthy, strict industrialist, inspired by the British 'stiff upper lip'. Ashok starts hating poor people & starts working hard to become rich because his mother abandoned him with his two other siblings and left for a richer man in the past. In the process of acquiring wealth, he becomes an unbearable disciplinarian and neglects his family consisting of his younger brother Anil (Shahrukh Khan) and sister Suneeta (Nivedita Saraf). He gets his sister Suneeta married to a man (Dalip Tahil) who turns out to be a golddigger, although she is in love with Ashok's manager (Vivek Vaswani). Anil goes against his brother's highhanded ways and marries Kavita a poor girl (Nagma), opting to leave the house.

Munna (Pooja Ruparel), an orphan arrives at Ashok Bansal's house & tries to thaw the icy strict Ashok. She creates havoc in Ashok's home and eventually manages to become the apple of his eye, while he tries to get her taken back from the orphanage run by a scheming drunkard warden (Sushmita Mukherjee), who had to bear losses due to Munna spilling the beans about her drunken behavior. Thanks to Munna's suggestions, he frees his sister from her abusive husband and brings her home.

When the orphanage warden plans to kidnap Munna to kill and dump her and usurp ransom from Ashok Bansal, not realizing their evil plan he lets Munna go. Realizing that he misses Munna, he decides to adopt Munna saving her from the clutches of the warden and her criminal boyfriend (Paresh Rawal) . Ashok Bansal eventually with the help of Munna mends fences with his own family and becomes a kind man with a one big happy family.

Cast 
Jackie Shroff as Ashok Bansal / a.k.a. King Uncle
Shahrukh Khan as Anil Bansal
Nagma as Kavita 
Anu Aggarwal as Fenni
Pooja Ruparel as Munna, Orphan girl.
Nivedita Joshi as Suneeta Bansal
Paresh Rawal as Pratap
Sushmita Mukherjee as Shanti, Orphanage Principal. 
Deven Verma as Karim, Head Servant.
Dalip Tahil as Pradeep Mallik
Bharat Kapoor as Mr Mallik, Pradeep's brother.
Madhu Malhotra as Mrs Mallik
Vivek Vaswani as Kamal, Ashok's Secretary and Sunita's love interest.
Viju Khote as jairam, Marriage Mediator of Sunita and Pradeep.
Dinesh Hingoo as Chunilal, Servant
Ghanshyam Rohera as Tiktiani, Servant
Raj Kishore as Bansal's Office Employee
Deb Mukherjee as PT Trainer and father of Ashok Bansal. (guest role)
Kunika as Kamla, mother of Ashok Bansal. (guest role)
Joginder as Truck Driver who fights and Quarrels with Ashok. (guest role)
Rajesh Puri as Hero in the Movie (guest role)
Guddi Maruti as Girl in the Movie (guest role)

Soundtrack
The music is composed by Rajesh Roshan, while the songs are written by Indeevar and Javed Akhtar. The film's song "Taare Aasman Ke Dharti Pe" as well as some continued melodies through the movie are sampled from the whistling tune used by Roxette in their song "Joyride". A similar song "Tera Shukriya", from the soundtrack of Shah Rukh Khan's earlier film Chamatkar, not featured in the movie itself, also uses the melody. The original song from where the melody was borrowed was a Kenyan Song named Jambo Bwana by Kenyan band Them Mushrooms.

Production
The titular role was originally offered to Amitabh Bachchan, but he declined.

References

External links

1990s Hindi-language films
1993 films
Films directed by Rakesh Roshan
Films scored by Rajesh Roshan
Films about orphans